Sir John Cruys or Cruise (died 1407) was a prominent Irish soldier, diplomat and judge of the late fourteenth and early fifteenth centuries. He was one of the most substantial landowners in County Dublin and County Meath, and built Merrion Castle near Dublin City in the 1360s. His marriage to the heiress of the powerful Verdon family of Clonmore brought him substantial lands in County Louth. He sat in the Irish Parliament and was a member of the King's Council. He was a highly regarded public servant, but also a determined and acquisitive man of business, who fought a ten-year battle to establish his wife's right to her inheritance.

Background

He was the son of Simon Cruys (died after 1366) and his wife and cousin Margaret Cruys, daughter and heiress of another John Cruys of Cruisetown. The Cruys or Cruise family, of Anglo-Norman origin, who first settled in Cornwall, came to Ireland with King Henry II of England during the Norman Invasion of Ireland in the late twelfth century. They acquired substantial lands, including Cruisetown in County Meath and Naul, Dublin. Simon held a number of official positions, including Chief Serjeant of Leinster and Escheator of County Dublin in 1366. The John Cruys who was a merchant in Dublin in the early 1400s is not known to have been a relative of Sir John.

Merrion Castle and other holdings

In 1366 John Bathe of Rathfeigh, County Meath (a member of another prominent Anglo-Irish family, who were based mainly at Drumcondra, Dublin) granted to John Cruys the lands of Thorncastle, i.e. modern-day Mount Merrion and Booterstown, and other lands at Donnybrook and Ballymun in Dublin. On his lands at Thorncastle, Cruys built Merrion Castle (although there are references to an earlier structure on the site), which became his principal dwelling. There is a reference to his being dispossessed of his lands there in the early 1390s, apparently due to the hostile action of Irish clans from County Wicklow. He also inherited the family's estates at nearby Stillorgan and at Naul, and acquired other lands in Dublin, Meath and, in right of his wife Matilda Verdon, in Louth. He held most of his lands directly from the English Crown, and in 1391 he was excused for life from paying the Crown rent on his lands at Thorncastle, due to their devastation by hostile Irish clans, "as they are so frequently burned and destroyed", noted the Patent Rolls. In 1414 his son Thomas was forgiven repayment of the arrears. However a later owner, James Fitzwilliam, who was Sir John's son-in-law, was required to pay rent to the Crown on Thorncastle of £5 and 8 shillings per year. In 1389  Sir John was forgiven repayment of the Crown rent of 40 shillings on his manor of Stillorgan, no doubt for the same reason.

Career

In 1376 he was sent to England with Maurice FitzGerald, 4th Earl of Kildare, on important diplomatic business, including a report to the English Crown on the state of Irish affairs, and was paid £20 for his expenses of the journey. The money may also have been, in part, redress for the devastation of his lands at Booterstown by the O'Byrne family in his absence, of which he later complained in a petition to the Crown. 

During the turbulent Lord Lieutenancy of Sir William de Windsor (1369-1376), Cruys was a supporter of Windsor. After Windsor's recall in disgrace in 1376, Cruys was probably out of favour for a time: according to a petition which he co-signed in 1379, the petitioners pleaded that they had been threatened with prosecution  and forfeiture of their lands. However, any check to his career was short-lived.

In 1380 he was summoned to the session of the Irish Parliament which met at Baltinglass. In 1382 he was appointed joint Guardian of the Peace for Dublin and Meath with William FitzWilliam and others, but stood down by 1391; FitzWilliam was sole Guardian in 1396. He also had judicial functions, and was justice in eyre in 1385. In the same year he led a military expedition against the O'Toole clan of County Wicklow, in which he was badly wounded, and received compensation from the Crown for his pains. He was Escheator of Ireland in 1372. According  to the Patent Roll of 1407 he also served as Sheriff.

The Verdon inheritance 

In 1386 the King's Escheator was ordered to convey to Cruys and his wife Matilda Verdon the lands of Clonmore (now Togher) and Mansfieldtown in County Louth. Matilda, whom he married before 1375, was the daughter and co-heiress with her sister Anna, wife of John Bellew of Bellewstown, of Sir Thomas Verdon of Clonmore (died 1375), head of the dominant Anglo-Norman family in County Louth and his wife Joan Hartort. Matilda's first husband was Peter Howth. Her father was a grand-nephew of Theobald de Verdun, 2nd Baron Verdun (died 1316). Matilda's recovery of Clonmore was the result of a determined and lengthy legal struggle against her male cousins, whom her father had tried to make his heirs, ignoring the right of his daughters to inherit his lands.

Later career 

In 1389 Cruys was serving as a justice in eyre again. In the same year he and Robert Eure ordered to inquire into possible breaches of a Parliamentary ordinance forbidding the purchase by English merchants of Irish falcons, which evidently fetched high prices in English markets. In 1394 he was summoned to the Great Council of Ireland. In 1395 he was paid £20 for supplying men and weapons for the English wars against the Irish of Wicklow, Westmeath and other parts of Ireland. He was knighted before 1399. In 1404 he was one of five Commissioners charged with summoning the magnates and commons of Dublin as the need required (presumably in case of a raid by the O'Toole and O'Byrne clans). 

In 1406 he was given the lands of Rathwire, County Westmeath  and the advowson (the right to appoint his own nominee as the parish priest) of the local church, and other lands at Rathmore, County Meath. He died the following year, although he was apparently still alive in April 1407, when the Crown forgave him his debts incurred as Sheriff and Escheator.

An inquisition held in 1408 shows the great extent of his holdings, with estates at Merrion, Thorncastle, Rathmore, Donaghpatrick, Clonmore, Kells, Naul, parts of Duleek and  Dundalk.

Family

He and Matilda had at least three children. Sir Thomas Cruys (died 1424), the son and heir, inherited most of his father's estates, which passed to his own son. One daughter, Maria, married Stephen Derpatrick of Stillorgan, and had a daughter Katherine. Another daughter married James Fitzwilliam, Chief Baron of the Irish Exchequer, by whom she had at least one son, Phillip. Philip Fitzwilliam in time inherited Merrion Castle, along with most of the Cruys lands, except Rathmore, Naul, which passed to another branch of the Cruys family, who held it until they were dispossessed by Oliver Cromwell, and Stillorgan, which was restored to the Cruys family after the younger Stephen Derpatrick (who seems to have been Sir John's great-grandson) was declared an outlaw in 1439. The Fitzwilliams in time came to own much of Dublin south of the River Liffey. 

Sir Thomas Cruys in 1414 received a full pardon for all his (presumably actually his father's) debts and arrears owed to the Crown. Later the same year he granted to William de Preston certain rents from his lands at Dundalk, Duleek and Kells, County Meath. He had leave to visit England in 1421. In 1423 he received another pardon for numerous acts of trespass on estates including Dundalk, Duleek and Kells, which, though they had belonged to his father, required a royal licence for him to enter, apparently because the Gyffard family were in possession of part of them. The pardon vested all these lands in him. He died in the autumn of 1424, leaving a son and heir Edward, who was still a minor. Sir Walter Lucy was granted all of Thomas Cruys's estates, presumably until Edward came of age. Edward seems to have died before 1432, when a younger son of Sir Thomas, Christopher, held the Cruys estates in Meath. In 1419 the Cruys lands at Rathmore, County Meath, were granted to John Wych, although the Cruys family is known to have held Rathmore a generation later. It then passed into the Plunket family by marriage. 

John's widow Matilda was still alive in 1415, when she exercised her family's right of advowson to appoint the priest to the local church at Clonmore.

See also 

 Thomas Fitz-Christopher Plunket

Sources
Ball, F. Elrington History of Dublin 6 Volumes 1902–1920 Dublin Alexander Thom and Co.
D'Alton, John King James's Irish Army List Privately Published Dublin 1860.
O'Kelly, Gerard Titania's Palace and the Mount Merrion Connection Dublin Historical Record 1998 Vol. 51 pp. 91–115.
Patentee Officers in Ireland  1173-1826
Smith, Brendan Crisis and Survival in Late Medieval Ireland: the English of Louth and their Neighbours 1330-1450 Oxford University Press 2013

References

1407 deaths
People from County Dublin
Irish knights
Members of the Parliament of Ireland (pre-1801)
Members of the Privy Council of Ireland
Irish judges
14th-century births